Have You Seen the Other Side of the Sky? is an album by Acid Mothers Temple & The Melting Paraiso U.F.O., released in 2006 by Ace Fu.

Track listing

Personnel

Credits, as stated on the Acid Mothers website:

 Tsuyama Atsushi - monster bass, voice, acoustic guitar, one-legged flute, sopranino recorder, organ-guitar, cosmic joker
 Higashi Hiroshi - synthesizer, dancin' king
 Uki Eiji - drums, wrecker & convoy
 Ono Ryoko - alto sax, flute, aesthetic perverted karman
 Nao - erotic voice, astral easy virtue
 Kawabata Makoto - electric guitar, sarangi, electric sitar, hurdygurdy, tambura, glockenspiel, electronics, short wave, percussion, voice, speed guru

Technical personnel

 Kawabata Makoto - production and engineering, photography 
 Yoshida Tatsuya - digital mastering
 Kawabata Sachiko - Art work 
 Tsuyama Akiko - photography
 Takayama Manabu - live photography
 Grga Mirjanic - live photography

References

2006 albums
Acid Mothers Temple albums
Ace Fu Records albums
Acid rock albums